Innocent Eyes may refer to:

Innocent Eyes (Graham Nash album), 1986
Innocent Eyes (2003 Delta Goodrem album), her debut album
"Innocent Eyes" (song), the title single of the above
Innocent Eyes (2006 Delta Goodrem album), a compilation of her two previous albums, released in Japan
"Innocent Eyes", a song by Annihilator from the album Refresh the Demon